Chorągwica Transmitter is a facility for FM- and TV-broadcasting at Chorągwica near Mietniów, Wieliczka County in Poland. Chorągwica transmitter uses as antenna tower a 286 metre tall guyed mast, built in 1962.

Transmitted Programmes

Digital Television MPEG-4

MUX 3*(SW) - Transmitters for Southern part Świętokrzyskie Voivodeship

Radio

References

External links
 https://web.archive.org/web/20070928014832/http://ukf.pl/index.php/topic%2C262.0.html
 http://emi.emitel.pl/EMITEL/obiekty.aspx?obiekt=DODR_S4A

Radio masts and towers in Poland
Wieliczka County
Buildings and structures in Lesser Poland Voivodeship
Towers completed in 1962
1962 establishments in Poland